The A124 highway is a highway in Nigeria. It is one of the east-west roads linking the main south-north roads. (It is named from the two highways it links).

It runs from the A1 highway north of Mokwa, Niger State to the A2 highway at Madalla near Abuja.

References

Highways in Nigeria